Dashtabi District is a district (bakhsh) in Buin Zahra County, Qazvin Province, Iran. At the 2006 census, its population was 24,139, in 5,879 families.  The District has one city: Ardak.  The District has two rural districts (dehestan): Western Dashtabi Rural District, and Eastern Dashtabi Rural District.

References 

Districts of Qazvin Province
Buin Zahra County